Herbert Courtland "Dummy" Murphy (December 18, 1886 – August 10, 1962) was an American professional baseball infielder. He played in Major League Baseball for the Philadelphia Phillies in 1914 as a shortstop. Partially deaf, he was sometimes referred to by the nickname "Dummy".

Career 
Murphy started his professional baseball career in 1912. The following season, with the Thomasville Hornets of the Empire State League, he batted .338 and was drafted by the Phillies in September. He started 1914 as a major league regular. However, he batted just .154 in nine games and made eight errors in the field. He was released in May and went to the Jersey City Skeeters, where he batted .235 the rest of the season.

Murphy spent the next few years in the minor leagues, mostly in the Pacific Coast League. In 1920, he was a player-manager for the South Atlantic League's Charlotte Hornets. He retired soon afterwards.

References

External links 

1886 births
1962 deaths
Major League Baseball shortstops
Philadelphia Phillies players
Greenwood Scouts players
Thomasville Hornets players
Jersey City Skeeters players
Portland Beavers players
Spokane Indians players
Los Angeles Angels (minor league) players
Salt Lake City Bees players
Seattle Giants players
Seattle Rainiers players
Charlotte Hornets (baseball) players
Minor league baseball managers
Baseball players from Illinois
People from Olney, Illinois